Midsommarkransen metro station is a station on the red line of the Stockholm metro, located in the district of Midsommarkransen. The station was opened on 5 April 1964 as part of the first stretch of the Red line, between T-Centralen and Fruängen. This is the last underground station in line 14 heading in the west direction.

References

Red line (Stockholm metro) stations
Railway stations opened in 1964